Rolf Erling Andersen (3 July 1947 – 7 August 2021) was a Norwegian politician for the Labour Party.
 
He was elected to Skien city council in 1983, and served as mayor in 1993, 1995–1999 and 2003–2011. He served as a deputy representative to the Parliament of Norway from Telemark during the terms 1997–2001 and 2001–2005. In total he met during 123 days of parliamentary session. He was a central board member of the Labour Party from 1995 to 2003.

He worked in the power company Skiensfjordens kommunale kraftselskap. He died in August 2021.

References

1947 births
2021 deaths
Deputy members of the Storting
Labour Party (Norway) politicians
Mayors of places in Telemark
Politicians from Skien